The 1st Indiana Volunteers, or the 1st Infantry Regiment, Indiana Volunteers, was a regiment of soldiers primarily from southern Indiana commanded by lieutenant colonel and future Governor of Indiana and United States Senator Henry S. Lane, during the Mexican–American War. It was the first regiment to be created by the state. Its arms were purchased using a loan from the Bank of Indiana, and was dispatched to Mexico in 1844. The regiment was primarily on patrol duty during its three-month tour, guarding supply lines and manning outposts. After returning from the war, many of the men in the unit reenlisted in the 5th Indiana Volunteers.

References 
 

Indiana in the Mexican–American War
Military units and formations of the Mexican–American War